Microbacterium paludicola is a Gram-positive, xylanolytic, short-rod-shaped and non-motile bacterium from the genus Microbacterium which has been isolated from swamp forest soil from Ulsan, Korea.

References

Further reading

External links
Type strain of Microbacterium paludicola at BacDive -  the Bacterial Diversity Metadatabase	

Bacteria described in 2006
paludicola